Dorothy Mae Stang (June 7, 1931 – February 12, 2005) was an American-born Brazilian member of the Congregation of the Sisters of Notre Dame de Namur. She was murdered in Anapu, a city in the state of Pará, in the Amazon Basin of Brazil. Stang had been outspoken in her efforts on behalf of the poor and the environment and had previously received death threats from loggers and landowners. Her cause for canonization as a martyr and model of sanctity is underway within the Congregation for the Causes of Saints.

Life 
Born on June 7, 1931, in Dayton, Ohio, but naturalized Brazilian, she entered the Sisters of Notre Dame de Namur community in 1948 and professed final vows in 1956. From 1951 to 1966, she taught elementary school classes at St. Victor School in Calumet City, Illinois, St. Alexander School in Villa Park, Illinois and Most Holy Trinity School in Phoenix, Arizona.

She began her ministry in Brazil in 1966, in Coroatá, Maranhão. Stang dedicated her life to defending the Brazilian rainforest from depletion from agriculture. She worked as an advocate for the rural poor beginning in the early 1970s, helping peasants make a living by farming small plots and extracting forest products without deforestation. She also sought to protect peasants from criminal gangs working on behalf of ranchers who were after their plots. Dot, as she was called by her family, friends and most locals in Brazil, is often pictured wearing a T-shirt with the slogan, "A Morte da floresta é o fim da nossa vida" which is Portuguese for "The Death of the Forest is the End of Our Lives".

Death 
On the morning of February 12, 2005, Stang woke up early to walk to a community meeting to speak about the rights for the Amazon. Ciero, a farmer Stang invited to the meeting, was going to be late. Ciero was a couple of minutes behind Stang, but he was able to see her and hid from the two armed men who followed her.  She progressed on and was blocked by the two men, Clodoaldo Carlos Batista and Raifran das Neves Sales, who worked in a livestock company. They asked if she had any weapons, and she claimed that the only weapon would be her Bible.  She then read a passage from the Beatitudes, "Blessed are the poor in spirit..." She continued a couple of steps but was suddenly stopped when Ciero called her "sister", as she was held at gunpoint by Raifran.  When Clodoaldo approved of discharging at Stang, Raifran fired a round at Stang's abdomen.  She fell face down on the ground.  Raifran fired another round into Stang's back, then fired all four remaining rounds into her head, killing her. She was 73 years old.

Investigation and trials 
The US Attorney's Office, Transnational Crime Unit, in Washington, DC, pursued an indictment of the four people (three in custody, one at large) under Title 18, USC 2332, a statute on international homicide. The key elements of this statute require 1) the victim be a US citizen, 2) that the murder takes place outside the US, and 3) that the murder was carried out to influence, pressure, or coerce a government or civilian group. Stang's murder met all the key elements.

In June 2005, two men were charged with conspiracy to murder an American outside the United States in connection with her death. These men, Rayfran das Neves Sales and Clodoaldo Carlos Batista, were convicted on December 10, 2005.

On May 15, 2007, a court in the city of Belém sentenced Vitalmiro Bastos de Moura, aged 36, to the maximum term of 30 years in prison for paying gunmen to shoot Stang. Stang's brother David, who was at the trial, said: "justice was done." In a second trial, Moura was acquitted of all charges, because the gunman, Rayfran das Neves Sales, declared in court to have killed Dorothy Stang for personal motivation. The prosecution appealed, however, and Moura was found guilty, and re-sentenced to 30 years in prison, on April 12, 2010.

Rayfran das Neves Sales was retried on October 22, 2007. He was again found guilty, and a judge in Belém sentenced him to 27 years in prison–the same punishment as in the first trial in 2005. Prosecutors said Moura had ordered Stang's death because she had sent letters to the local authorities accusing Moura of setting illegal fires to clear land, which led to his receiving a substantial fine. At a third trial, on May 6, 2008, Rayfran das Neves Sales was sentenced to 28 years in prison.

Regivaldo Pereira Galvão, a rancher suspected of ordering the killing, was arrested in December 2008 and was to be charged with the murder. He had been arrested previously for the murder but released.

On April 7, 2009, the Court of Justice, in Pará, decided to void the third trial. The same court decided to put Vitalmiro Bastos de Moura back in jail but Moura's lawyer appealed that decision. A new trial was to be scheduled. On April 22, 2009, Superior Court of Justice of Brazil set Vitalmiro Moura free until a final decision about his request of Habeas corpus.

Roniery Lopes, a witness in the trial of Regivaldo Galvão for fraud, was shot in November 2009, just before he was to testify.

On February 4, 2010, Superior Court of Justice revoked Vitalmiro Moura's habeas corpus. Moura was arrested on February 7, after surrendering voluntarily to police. On April 12, 2010, he was convicted again by a jury and sentenced to 30 years in prison.

On May 1, 2010, Regivaldo Galvão was also convicted of having ordered the murder. He was sentenced to 30 years in prison.

On August 21, 2012, the Brazilian Supreme Court conceded a Habeas Corpus to Regivaldo Galvão. The defense attorney claims that the jury decided to condemn Reginaldo before all the legal recourses available to the defendant were exhausted. Regivaldo Galvão was freed the following day.

On May 15, 2013, Brazil's Supreme Court overturned the conviction of Vitalmiro Moura. On September 19, 2013, Moura was convicted of the murder for a fourth time and sentenced to 30 years in prison by a court in Pará State.

In July 2013, das Neves Sales gained early release from prison. On September 20, 2014, Neves Sales was arrested again facing accusations of having killed a young man and woman with whom he had a drug deal. They supplied 50 kilograms of cocaine from Bolivia, but instead of paying them for the consignment, Sales fatally shot them.

Documentary 
On March 2, U.S. Ambassador John Danilovich met with Dorothy Stang's brother David, Daniel Junge, who was traveling with Stang to film a documentary, and Sister Mary Ellis McCabe, a member of Dorothy's religious congregation who was stationed in Ceará, Brazil. Stang and Junge were in Brasília to meet with Minister of Justice Marcio Thomaz Bastos after visiting the site of Stang's sister's murder in Para state. Stang thanked the Ambassador for the Embassy's support and said that he was pleased with the Brazilian federal government's reaction. He was very critical, however, of Para state authorities for failing to protect his sister and for failing to offer their condolences during his visit.

In 2008, the American filmmaker Daniel Junge released a documentary titled They Killed Sister Dorothy. The film is narrated by Martin Sheen in the version in English and by Wagner Moura in the version in Portuguese. The film received the Audience Award and the Competition Award at the 2008 South by Southwest Festival, where it had its worldwide première.

Opera 
In 2009, Evan Mack composed an opera based on the life of Sr. Dorothy Stang. Angel of the Amazon depicts her life's work, her devotion to her mission with Brazilian peasant farmers, and the events that sent her on a path of martyrdom. Encompass New Opera Theatre developed the opera in 2010.

Other notable mentions 

A brief overview of the circumstances and murder of Sister Dorothy Stang is discussed in the movie Cowspiracy (2014).

A center for social justice activism at Notre Dame de Namur University is named for her.

In 2021, a species of owl discovered in the Amazon rainforest was named Megascops stangiae after sister Stang.

Posthumous United Nations Human Rights Prize 
Dorothy Stang received the United Nations Human Rights Prize posthumously on December 10, 2008.

See also 
Chico Mendes
Environment of Brazil
Indigenous people in Brazil
José Cláudio Ribeiro da Silva
Vicente Canas
Wilson Pinheiro

References

Notes 

  reference to an Article in the January 2007 issue of National Geographic
   Article in the July/August 2005 issue of Maryknoll (maryknoll.org)

Further reading 
 Le Breton, Binka. The Greatest Gift: The Courageous Life and Martyrdom of Sister Dorothy  Stang.. New York: Doubleday. 2008
 Le Breton, Binka. A Maior Dádiva:  A Vida e Morte Corajosas da Irmã Dorothy Stang.. São Paulo: Editora Globo. 2008
 Le Breton, Binka. Audiobook.  The Greatest Gift: The Courageous Life and Martydom of Sister Dorothy Stang.. read by Binka Le Breton. Cincinnati: St Anthony's Messenger Press. 2008
 Murphy, Roseanne. Martyr of the Amazon: The Life of Sister Dorothy Stang.. New York: Orbis Books. 2007
 Murdock,Michele. "A Journey of Courage:The Amazing Story of Sister Dorothy Stang." Sisters of Notre Dame de Namur, Cincinnati Ohio,2010.

External links 
 
 Sydney Morning Herald article on the killing, 27 February 2005
 The Student, the Nun & the Amazon (www.studentnunamazon.com)
 Dorothy Stang Center at Notre Dame de Namur University, Belmont California
 Angel of the Amazon An opera based on the life of Sr. Dorothy by Evan Mack
 Amazonia, Dorothy Stang's Struggle A Net for God documentary in 22 languages (also available in YouTube)
 
 Wikileaks.ca
 http://wikileaks.ca/cable/2005/03/05BRASILIA606.html
 http://wikileaks.ca/cable/2008/05/08BRASILIA640.html
 http://wikileaks.ca/cable/2005/03/05BRASILIA821.html
 http://wikileaks.ca/cable/2005/03/05BRASILIA532.html
 http://wikileaks.ca/cable/2005/02/05BRASILIA464.html
 http://wikileaks.ca/cable/2005/02/05BRASILIA437.html
 https://web.archive.org/web/20110204070244/http://wikileaks.ca/cable/2005/02/05BRASILIA369.html

20th-century Brazilian Roman Catholic nuns
Brazilian anti-poverty advocates
Assassinated American activists
21st-century Brazilian Roman Catholic nuns
People from Dayton, Ohio
Sisters of Notre Dame de Namur
Roman Catholic activists
Deaths by firearm in Brazil
American people murdered abroad
People murdered in Brazil
1931 births
2005 deaths
American emigrants to Brazil
Female Christian missionaries
Forestry in Brazil
Forest conservation
American environmentalists
Brazilian women environmentalists
American women environmentalists
Brazilian environmentalists
Female murder victims
Environmental killings
Naturalized citizens of Brazil
Brazilian Servants of God
21st-century venerated Christians
Activists from Ohio
Catholics from Ohio
20th-century American Roman Catholic nuns